The Father/Son Challenge, titled since 2020 as the PNC Championship under a sponsorship agreement with PNC Financial Services, is an annual golf tournament for two-player teams, consisting of PGA Tour and Champions Tour golfers and (usually) their sons. It is played over two days (36 holes) for the Willie Park Trophy, in memory of the father and son British Open champions Willie Park Sr. and Willie Park Jr. The field of twenty teams plays a scramble format. In 2012, the prize fund was $1,000,000; the tournament is jointly owned by IMG and NBC Sports.

The qualifying player must have won a major championship or The Players Championship (often touted as the "fifth major") to be eligible for an invitation.  The guest team members range from middle school age up to senior citizens, and sometimes include a few with tour golf careers of their own, but cannot be a touring professional at the time of the tournament.

Venues have been as follows:
1995–1998 Vero Beach, Florida
1999 Twin Eagles Golf Club in Naples, Florida
2000–2002 The Ocean Club in Paradise Island, Bahamas
2003–2008 Champions Gate Golf Resort in Orlando, Florida
2009–2011 not played
2012–present Ritz-Carlton Golf Club in Orlando, Florida

The event's name took on a somewhat looser interpretation when Fuzzy Zoeller teamed up with his daughter Gretchen in 2005. In 2013 and 2016, Bernhard Langer played with his daughter Christina, and in 2013, Arnold Palmer played with his grandson Sam Saunders.

Winners

Source:

References

External links

Coverage on the PGA Tour's official site

PGA Tour unofficial money events
Golf in Florida
Sports competitions in Orlando, Florida
Recurring sporting events established in 1995
1995 establishments in Florida